Constituency NA-116 (Narowal-II) was a constituency for the National Assembly of Pakistan. It chiefly comprised the Shakargarh Tehsil before the Tehsil's area was divided among the constituencies of NA-77 and NA-78 in the 2018 delimitation. As a result, this constituency was abolished.

Election 2002 

General elections were held on 10 Oct 2002. Daniyal Aziz of PML-Q won by 41,857 votes.

Election 2008 

General elections were held on 18 Feb 2008. Chaudhry Muhammad Tariq Anis an Independent candidate won by 45.097 votes.

Election 2013 

General elections were held on 11 May 2013. Daniyal Aziz of PML-N won by 91,409 votes and became the  member of National Assembly.

References

External links 
 Election result's official website

NA-116